In basketball, a block (short for blocked shot) occurs when a defender deflects or stops a field goal attempt without committing a foul. The National Collegiate Athletic Association's (NCAA) Division I block title is awarded to the player with the highest blocks per game average in a given season. The block title was first recognized in the 1985–86 season when statistics on blocks were first compiled by the NCAA.

David Robinson of Navy holds the all-time NCAA Division I record single-season total blocks record (207) which was set during 1985–86, coincidentally the first season that the NCAA kept track of blocked shots. Although Robinson holds the single-season record, it is Jarvis Varnado of Mississippi State who claims the all-time career blocked shots record (564). The highest single-season blocks per game (bpg) record is held by Northeastern's Shawn James, who averaged 6.53 blocks in 2005–06.

Four players have been two-time NCAA bpg leaders: David Robinson (1986, 1987), Keith Closs (1995, 1996), Tarvis Williams (1999, 2001) and Jarvis Varnado (2008, 2009). Additionally, six freshmen have led Division I in blocks: Alonzo Mourning (1989), Shawn Bradley (1991), Keith Closs (1995), Hassan Whiteside (2010), Anthony Davis (2012), and Chris Obekpa (2013). Among all-time NCAA blocks leaders, only Robinson, Mourning, and Shaquille O'Neal are members of the Naismith Memorial Basketball Hall of Fame.

Keith Closs, the blocks leader in 1995 and 1996, only played college basketball for two seasons. He left the NCAA after only two years to pursue a career in professional basketball, thereby foregoing his final two seasons of eligibility under NCAA by-laws. Had he decided to stay at Central Connecticut, Closs could have potentially become the first player to lead Division I in blocks for not only three years, but possibly all four.

Nine players on this list were born outside the United States—Shawn Bradley in Germany (West Germany at the time of his birth), Adonal Foyle in Saint Vincent and the Grenadines, Wojciech Myrda in Poland, Deng Gai in what is now South Sudan (part of Sudan at the time of his birth), Chris Obekpa in Nigeria, Jordan Bachynski in Canada, Vashil Fernandez in Jamaica, Liam Thomas in Australia, and Ajdin Penava in Bosnia and Herzegovina.

Key

Blocks leaders

References
General

Specific

NCAA Division I men's basketball statistical leaders